Deh-e Bala (also Romanized as Deh-e Bālā and Deh Bālā) is a village in Rameshk Rural District, Chah Dadkhoda District, Qaleh Ganj County, Kerman Province, Iran. At the 2006 census, its population was 420, in 105 families.

References 

Populated places in Qaleh Ganj County